Consort Hwang may refer to:

Consort Hwang (Yongle) (1401–1421), concubine of the Yongle Emperor
Crown Princess Yangje Hwang ( 1550s), consort of Crown Prince Sunhoe

See also
Consort Hwangbo (disambiguation)